While under the Trapezius, the medial branch of the posterior division of the third cervical nerve gives off a branch called the third occipital nerve (also known as the least occipital nerve), which pierces the Trapezius and ends in the skin of the lower part of the back of the head.

It lies medial to the greater occipital nerve and communicates with it.

Additional images

External links
 http://www.dartmouth.edu/~humananatomy/figures/chapter_47/47-2.HTM
 http://www.dartmouth.edu/~humananatomy/figures/chapter_47/47-6.HTM

Spinal nerves